The União das Escolas de Samba de São Paulo – Union of the Samba Schools of São Paulo – or UESP is an entity that organizes the parades of the Carnival of São Paulo, SP, Brazil.

It was created in 1973 when the samba schools obtained their recognition, because in that epoch the entity helped councils to regularize their statutes, professionalizing the parades.

Nowadays the entity counts on 68 other carnivalesque entities, among samba schools, schools of inferior divisions, and carnivalesque blocos.

Presidents

Grupo Especial de Bairro 
 Sunday

 Flor de Vila Dalila
 Acadêmicos de São Jorge
 Unidos de São Miguel
 Boêmios da Vila
 Imperatriz da Sul
 União Imperial

 Monday

 TUP
 Imperatriz da Paulicéia
 União Independente da Zona Sul
 Combinados de Sapopemba
 Unidos do Vale Encantado
 Unidos de Guaianases

Grupo 1 de Bairro 
 Sunday

 Lavapés
 Os Bambas
 Mocidade Robruense
 Em Cima da Hora Paulistana
 Raízes
 Príncipe Negro

 Monday

 Prova de Fogo
 Império Lapeano
 Isso Memo
 União de Vila Albertina
 Flor de Liz
 Unidos de São Lucas

Grupo 2 de Bairro 
 Saturday

 Filhos do Zaire
 Acadêmicos do Ipiranga
 Explosão Zona Norte
 Saudosa Maloca
 Só Vou Se Você For
 Estação Invernada
 Passo de Ouro
 Cacique do Parque
 Império Real
 Cabeções de Vila Prudente
 Dragões de Vila Alpina

Grupo 3 de Bairro 
 Sunday

 Locomotiva Piritubana
 Unidos do Jardim Primavera
 Acadêmicos de Campo Limpo

 Sunday

 Folha Verde
 Unidos do Jaçanã
 Imperial da Vila Penteado
 Império do Samba

 Monday

 Estrela Cadente
 Raízes da Vila Prudente
 Primeira da Aclimação
 Iracema Meu Grande Amor

External links 

 Official website 

São Paulo Carnival
Samba schools of São Paulo